Ajuga iva, the southern bugle, is a species of perennial herb in the family Lamiaceae. They have a self-supporting growth form and simple, broad leaves. Individuals can grow to 5 cm. Subspecies include Ajuga iva subsp. iva and Ajuga iva subsp. pseudoiva.

References 

iva
Flora of Malta